Operation: Rabbit is a 1952 Warner Bros. Looney Tunes animated cartoon directed by Chuck Jones. The cartoon was released on January 19, 1952, and features Bugs Bunny and Wile E. Coyote. This marks the second appearance of Wile E. Coyote, the first where he is named, and the first where he has spoken dialogue.

Plot
Set in the desert, Operation: Rabbit opens with Wile E. Coyote running up to Bugs Bunny's burrow and constructing a door. He knocks on the door and Bugs, slightly bemused by the addition to his property, opens it saying his famous catchphrase: "Eh, what's up, Doc?" The Coyote proclaims, in his very first spoken line of dialogue ever, that he is a genius, as well as being faster, taller, and stronger than Bugs, and that he intends to eat the rabbit too. He goes on to advise Bugs that it is futile to try and escape, since Bugs "could hardly pass the entrance examinations to kindergarten", an insult that seems to bore Bugs. (Wile E. displays an enlarged self-confidence throughout not only this film but also in other appearances with Bugs, aside from Hare-Breadth Hurry.) An unimpressed Bugs then slams the door in Wile E.'s face ("I'm sorry, Mac, the lady of the house ain't home. And besides, we mailed you people a check last week,"). The Coyote goes back to his cave home, taking the door with him ("Why do they always want to do it the hard way?").

1. The Coyote's first plan is to trap Bugs in his own hole by putting a portable pressure cooker on top of it, cooking Bugs alive. He chops up vegetables, throws them down the hole, adds an egg, a drop of cooking oil, some seasoning, tosses it into a salad, then places the pressure cooker on top. Bugs watches Wile E.'s work from another hole (suggesting his burrow has a back door), then walks up to him and asks "Eh, what's cookin', Doc?" When Wile E. informs him that "rabbit stew" is cooking ("Gad, I'm SUCH a genius!"), Bugs casually observes, "There's only one little thing wrong with it", that there is no rabbit. As Wile E. frantically looks under the cooker, Bugs gives him a big kick down the hole and sticks the cooker on top of him. Bugs then goes back down the second hole while singing, "I'm lookin' over a three-leaf clover that I overlooked bethree...", picks up a bat, and clobbers the Coyote from below (off-screen), prompting Wile E., with a huge lump on his head, to remark: "Well, back to the old drawing board."

2. In the next scene, the Coyote prepares his second plan: the use of a chute for firing a cannonball into Bugs' hole. After the ball arrives in the hole via a cannon and that chute, Bugs uses a second chute to return the ball, where it explodes on target, causing the plan to quite literally backfire on Wile E.

Bugs then goes to Wile E.'s cave, claiming that he is surrendering "on account of I cannot fight no more against such genius," and wants Wile E. to sign as a witness to his last will and testament. He gives the Coyote the document and a "fountain pen", which is really a stick of dynamite being lit. Wile E. pretends to be fooled, putting out the fuse when Bugs hands over the dynamite ("Very amateurish attempt on my person"). While he gloats ("Being a genius certainly has its advantages"), Wile E. is unaware that there is another lit fuse at the other end of the dynamite. Once Wile E. spots the fuse in dazed shock, the dynamite explodes on cue.

3. The Coyote then builds a mechanical (and explosive) lady rabbit that will be used as a decoy for Bugs. ("Brilliance. That's all I can say. Sheer, unadulterated brilliance!") Bugs, already anticipating this plan, builds an explosive lady coyote in response ("Fight fire with fire, I always say"). Bugs detonates the coyote robot just as Wile E. is romantically embracing it in his cave. With this distraction, Wile E. completely forgets about the rabbit robot ("Oh, NO!"), which, as he is in the process of trying to throw it out, also blows up in the cave.

4. The Coyote then creates an exploding flying saucer with a radarscope mechanism able to detect birds, mice, and rabbits. The disc flies to Bugs' hole, but Bugs thwarts it by putting on a chicken mask, though the saucer quickly looks back when Bugs tries to peek, but Bugs is quicker and fools it again, so it finally turns away in uncertainty. The disguised Bugs then adds "COYOTE" to the radarscope's target options and moves the dial there. The saucer speeds back to Wile E.'s cave, blowing the entire mountain to smithereens.

5. The Coyote makes one last plan: filling a row of fake carrots with liquid nitroglycerin inside an explosives shack within a construction site (set to Carl Stalling's quote of a Richard Wagner leitmotiv from Siegfried). Bugs, using a tractor and a rope lasso, pulls the shack to a nearby railroad line.  The rope is released and the shack, with Wile E. inside, is sitting on the tracks. As Wile E. admires his new self-given title of "Super Genius" while finishing his carrot baits, a train is seen approaching. Upon hearing the train whistle, the Coyote turns to the shack window to see the train bearing down on him, and futilely pulls down a window shade. When the train hits the shack, all of the explosives in the shack detonate. The painfully burned Coyote groans in an ironic tone while holding a tree branch on the edge of a cliff as the train chugs away below undamaged ("'Wile E. Coyote - Super Senious'").

Wile E., still dazed and covered in ash, returns to Bugs' hole, rebuilds his door, knocks on it and admits defeat ("Allow me to introduce myself. My name is Mud",) before passing out. In response, Bugs says, "And remember, MUD spelled backwards is DUM (as in dumb)" (a spoof of the advertising slogan for Serutan laxatives, "Serutan spelled backwards is 'natures'"), shaking his head and swirling his eyebrows as the iris fades out.

Production
This was the second cartoon to feature Wile E. Coyote (following 1949's Fast and Furry-ous), and the first in which he is identified by his full name. It is also the first in which the Coyote speaks; his voice, like Bugs, was provided by Mel Blanc. The two characters would reappear together in the cartoons To Hare Is Human (1956), Rabbit's Feat (1960), Compressed Hare (1961), and Hare-Breadth Hurry (1963).

Home video
The short was released on the Looney Tunes Golden Collection: Volume 4, Disc One.

References

External links

 

1950s English-language films
1952 animated films
1952 short films
Looney Tunes shorts
Warner Bros. Cartoons animated short films
Short films directed by Chuck Jones
Wile E. Coyote and the Road Runner films
Films scored by Carl Stalling
Bugs Bunny films
1950s Warner Bros. animated short films
Films with screenplays by Michael Maltese
Films set in deserts
American animated short films
Animated films about rabbits and hares
Films about Canis
Films produced by Edward Selzer